Lahcen Ikassrien is a citizen of Morocco who was held in extrajudicial detention in the United States Guantanamo Bay detainment camps, in Cuba.
Ikassrien's Guantanamo ISN was 72.
The Department of Defense reports that Ikassrien was born on October 2, 1972, in Targist, Morocco.

On June 16, 2014, he was arrested in Madrid accused of jihadism. He received a 10 year sentence, on September 30, 2016, after being convicted of recruiting individuals to go to war-torn Syria. Ikassrien alleged that he and other Guantanamo Bay detainees were tortured during their detention, and a Spanish magisterial investigation concluded that they had been subject to abusive interrogation techniques.

Background

When Ikassrien was first captured authorities thought his name was Reswan A. Abdesalam.
His real identity was revealed through his fingerprints.

Ikassrien was believed to have ties to Imad Eddin Barakat Yarkas, a mastermind of the Madrid bombing.

On July 18, 2005, Ikassrien was extradited to stand trial in Spain.

The International Herald Tribune reported that Ikassrien was acquitted on October 11, 2006.

Official status reviews

Originally the Bush Presidency asserted that captives apprehended in the "war on terror" were not covered by the Geneva Conventions, and could be held indefinitely, without charge, and without an open and transparent review of the justifications for their detention.
In 2004 the United States Supreme Court ruled, in Rasul v. Bush, that Guantanamo captives were entitled to being informed of the allegations justifying their detention, and were entitled to try to refute them.

Office for the Administrative Review of Detained Enemy Combatants

Following the Supreme Court's ruling, the Department of Defense set up the Office for the Administrative Review of Detained Enemy Combatants.

Combatant status review

Initially, the Bush administration asserted that they could withhold all the protections of the Geneva Conventions to captives from the war on terror. This policy was challenged before the Judicial branch. Critics argued that the USA could not evade its obligation to conduct competent tribunals to determine whether captives are, or are not, entitled to the protections of prisoner of war status.

Subsequently, the Department of Defense instituted the Combatant Status Review Tribunals. The Tribunals, however, were not authorized to determine whether the captives were lawful combatants—rather they were merely empowered to make a recommendation as to whether the captive had previously been correctly determined to match the Bush administration's definition of an enemy combatant.

Allegations

The following allegations were presented to his Tribunal:

Transcript

There is no record that Lahcen Ikassrien chose to participate in his Combatant Status Review Tribunal.

Torture 
On November 19, 2006, El País published an article in which Ikassrien alleges that he had been tortured repeatedly over the course of a month during his detention in Kandahar. He alleges that he was subjected to various forms of torture, including being trapped with aggressive dogs, being tied up, and that soldiers held him in a cage where they showered him with feces and urine while calling him "Animal No. 64".

Torture claims investigation

On April 29, 2009, that Spanish investigating magistrate Baltasar Garzon initiated a formal investigation into whether confessions from Ikassrien,
and three other former Guantanamo captives were the result of the use of abusive interrogation techniques.
Ikassrien,
and the other three men:
Hamed Abderrahman Ahmed, Jamiel Abdul Latif al Banna and Omar Deghayes, had previously faced charges in Spanish courts, based on confessions they made while in US custody.
Their charges had been dropped based on their claims that their confessions were false and were the result of abusive interrogation techniques.

See also
 The Bush Six
 Torture
 Imran v. Bush

References

External links
 The Case of Lahcen Ikassrien: Torture in Kandahar and Guantánamo Andy Worthington
 Animal Number 64 El País – November 20, 2006 (translated into English by the Center for the Study of Human Rights in the Americas)
 The Guantánamo Files: Website Extras (1) – The Qala-i-Janghi Massacre Andy Worthington

Moroccan extrajudicial prisoners of the United States
Berber Moroccans
Living people
1972 births
Guantanamo detainees known to have been released
Kandahar detention facility detainees
People extradited from the United States
People extradited to Spain